Hariharpara Assembly constituency is an assembly constituency in Murshidabad district in the Indian state of West Bengal.

Overview
As per orders of the Delimitation Commission Hariharpara Vidhan Sabha constituency covers Hariharpara community development block and Chhaighari and Madanpur gram panchayats of Berhampore community development block.

This constituency is part of No. 11 Murshidabad (Lok Sabha constituency).

Members of Legislative Assembly

Notable Person 

 Niamot Sheikh(Current M.L.A) of Hariharpara.

Election results

2021
In the 2021 election, Niamot Sheikh of Trinamool Congress defeated his nearest rival Alamgir Mir of Congress.

2016
In the 2016 election, Niamot Sheikh of Trinamool Congress defeated his nearest rival Alamgir Mir of Congress.

2011
In the 2011 election, Insar Ali Biswas of CPI(M) defeated his nearest rival Niamot Sheikh of Trinamool Congress.

Alamgir Mir, contesting as an independent, was a rebel Congress candidate, supported by the Baharampur MP, Adhir Chowdhury.

.# Swing calculated on Congress+Trinamool Congress vote percentages in 2006 taken together.

1977–2006
In the 2006 state assembly elections Insar Ali Biswas of CPI(M) won the Hariharpara assembly seat defeating his nearest rival Niamot Sheikh of Congress. Contests in most years were multi cornered but only winners and runners are being mentioned. Niamot Sheikh, Independent, defeated Nizamuddin of CPI(M) in 2001. Mozammel Haque of CPI(M) defeated Mannan Hossain of Congress in 1996, Khaanarul Hossain of Congress in 1991, and Shaikh Imajuddin of Congress in 1987. Shaikh Imajuddin of Congress defeated Mozammel Haque of CPI(M) in 1982 and Abu Raihan Biswas of SUC in 1977.

1951–1972
Abu Raihan Biswas of SUC won in 1972. Aftabuddin Ahmed, Independent, won in 1971. Aftabuddin Ahmed of Progressive Muslim League won in 1969. S.Ahmed of Congress won in 1967. Abdul Latif of Congress won in 1962. Haji A. Hameed of Congress won in 1957 and in independent India's first election in 1951.

References

Assembly constituencies of West Bengal
Politics of Murshidabad district